Haiyang Township is a township under the administration of Xiushan Tujia and Miao Autonomous County, Chongqing, China. , it has six villages under its administration:
Xiaoping Village
Yizhi Village
Yanyuan Village
Bamao Village
Balian Village
Wusi Village

References 

Township-level divisions of Chongqing
Xiushan Tujia and Miao Autonomous County